Nathaniel Drinkwater is a fictional character, the protagonist of a series of novels by Richard Woodman. In the series, he is an officer in the British Royal Navy during the Napoleonic Wars.

Life 
According to Woodman, Drinkwater was born on 28 October 1762 to a relatively poor family. His naval career started in 1779, with his appointment to frigate HMS Cyclops as a midshipman under Captain Hope, where he encountered long-standing adversary Augustus Morris (then a senior midshipman), friend Richard White (then a junior midshipman) and patron Lord Dungarth (then First Lieutenant) while fighting in the American War of Independence. After initial success as prizemaster of the American privateer Algonquin, passing as master's mate, and a period as Acting Lieutenant, Drinkwater survived the sinking of HMS Royal George but lost his chance of a commission as a result of Admiral Kempenfelt's death, instead providentially finding employment as a mate on Trinity House yachts. Subsequently re-employed as a master's mate, he found himself serving in HMS Kestrel, a cutter on special service in the English Channel, in which he first encountered Hortense Santonax nee Montholon, who haunted his imagination for decades thereafter, and with whose husband Eduard Santhonax, a talented and ruthless Bonapartist naval officer, he found himself recurrently in conflict over the following years. His commission as Lieutenant was confirmed by Admiral Duncan following Kestrel's action with a French yacht on the periphery of the Battle of Camperdown. Moving with Kestrel's irascible Welsh captain Madoc Griffiths to brig HMS Hellebore, Drinkwater was sent to eh Red Sea by Admiral Lord Nelson, only to lose Hellebore on Daedalus Reef but gain French frigate Antigone in a cutting out operation. Deprived of his proposed command of Antigone in favour of Lieutenant Augustus Morris, Drinkwater survived an encounter with a better-armed French frigate and Morris was removed from command. Drinkwater was given command of bomb vessel tender HMS Virago as part of the British expedition to Copenhagen to neutralise the Danish fleet, and managed to attract the support of both Admirals Parker and Nelson as a result of his assistance in surveying the battleground. He was severely wounded by shell splinters during Nelson's bombardment of Boulogne but was then appointed by Lord St Vincent as Acting Captain of the corvette HMS Melusine, whose captain had been fatally wounded in a duel. Melusine escorted whalers to the Arctic on what initially seemed an idyllic cruise, but encountered a French privateer, Requin, with whom two of the whaler captains were in league, resulting in a bloody battle in which Drinkwater killed treacherous whaler captain Ellerby.

The Nathaniel Drinkwater novels 
The novels, in chronological order
An Eye of the Fleet
A King's Cutter
A Brig of War
The Bomb Vessel
The Corvette
1805
Baltic Mission
In Distant Waters
A Private Revenge
Under False Colours
The Flying Squadron
Beneath the Aurora
The Shadow of the Eagle
Ebb Tide

Characters in British novels of the 20th century
Novel series by featured character
Fictional Royal Navy personnel
Fictional sailors